The 2016–17 Men's FIH Hockey World League Final was the final stage of the 2016–17 edition of the Men's FIH Hockey World League. It took place between 1 and 10 December 2017 in Bhubaneswar, India.

Australia won the tournament for a record second time after defeating Argentina 2–1 in the final match. India won the third place match by defeating Germany 2–1.

Qualification

The host nation qualified automatically in addition to 7 teams qualified from the Semifinals. The following eight teams, shown with final pre-tournament rankings, competed in this round of the tournament.

Results
All times are local (UTC+5:30).

First round

Pool A

Pool B

Second round

Quarter-finals

Fifth to eighth place classification
The losing quarterfinalists are ranked according to their first-round results to determine the fixtures for the fifth to eighth place classification matches.

Seventh place game

Fifth place game

First to fourth place classification

Semi-finals

Third place game

Final

Statistics

Final ranking

Awards
The following individual awards were given at the conclusion of the tournament.

Goalscorers

See also
2016–17 Women's FIH Hockey World League Final

References

External links
Official website

Final
FIH Hockey World League Men
International field hockey competitions hosted by India
Sport in Bhubaneswar
FIH Hockey World League Final Men